Paris is an unincorporated community in Lane County, in the U.S. state of Oregon. It is a rural locale in the Central Oregon Coast Range north of the Siuslaw River and south of the Alsea River along one of its tributaries, Five Rivers.

History
A post office called Paris was established in 1909, and remained in operation until it was discontinued in 1933. G. E. Parris, the first postmaster, gave the community its name.

References

Unincorporated communities in Lane County, Oregon
Unincorporated communities in Oregon